Otto Plantener (26 April 1889 – 9 April 1964) was a Danish sports shooter. He competed in three events at the 1920 Summer Olympics.

References

External links
 

1889 births
1964 deaths
Danish male sport shooters
Olympic shooters of Denmark
Shooters at the 1920 Summer Olympics
Sportspeople from Odense